Críostóir Ó Floinn/O'Flynn (born 18 December 1927) is a bilingual writer (writing in English he uses the Anglicised form, as did Pádraig Mac Piarais/P.H.Pearse). Born in Limerick at Christmas, 1927, in 1952 he married Rita Beegan of Farranshone, Limerick. They live in County Dublin and have seven children, seventeen grandchildren, and four greatgrandchildren. He was educated and taught Irish by Sisters of Mercy, lay teachers, and Christian Brothers. He trained as a teacher at Coláiste Pádraig, Drumcondra, and he holds degrees in Literature and Education from U.C.D. and Trinity College. He has published over sixty works in all genres, and won many literary awards; he has also written many plays for radio and television, as well as working freelance in broadcasting and journalism (he wrote a weekly column in Irish for eight years in the now defunct Irish Press). His poems and short  stories were published in magazines in Ireland, Britain and the US, and he has published translations from Irish and other languages, including a prize-winning Irish version of the three initial cantos of  Dante's Divina Commedia. He left teaching in 1960 to work for a brief period as a writer for Bord Fáilte, an experience that gave him a ready made play, Is É Dúirt Polonius (What Polonius Said).  He is one  of the most prolific and versatile Irish writers of the twentieth century; he is also the most censored writer, although he is not mentioned in any books on that theme where only official censorship for sexual content is recorded (see Consplawkus and A Writer's Life). Although some of his plays were produced at the Abbey Theatre, and he was the first playwright to be awarded an Abbey bursary, two of his best plays were rejected on moral grounds, causing him to be sacked from teaching posts, directly in 1962 by the Archbishop of Cashel and indirectly in 1968 by the Archbishop of Dublin, after the plays were produced elsewhere. One of these, Cóta Bán Chríost/The Order of Melchizedek, having won the Oireachtas drama award, hailed as a masterpiece by the adjudicator, Walter Macken, and also the Douglas Hyde memorial award, hailed as "a deeply religious play" by a committee chaired by Tomás (later Cardinal) Ó Fiaich, and described by the author's London agent as the best play she had ever read, was rejected in both Irish and English versions by the Abbey directors, who described it as blasphemous, obscene, etc. In 2021 LeabhairComhar published his collected Irish poems under the title Éigse Saoil (Poems of a Lifetime).

Bibliography 
 Lá Dá bhFaca Thú (1955), novel 
 An tIolar Dubh agus Long na Marbh (1958), a novel
 Cóta Bán Chríost (1966), an Irish-language play 
 The Order of Melchizedek, an English-language version of Cóta Bán Chríost
 Séanaid Bás le h-Adhart (1965) novel
 Learairí Lios an Phúca (1968), novel
 A Poet in Rome, poetry collection
 Sanctuary Island (1971), short stories
 Banana, poetry collection
 Is É A Dúirt Polonius (1973), play
 Mise Raifteirí an File (1974), play
 Van Gogh Chocolates, poetry collection
 Aisling Dhá Abhainn (1977), poetry collection
 Ó Fhás go hAois, poetry collection
 Centenary (1985), a 5,000 line poem chronicling the history of the Gaelic Athletic Association
 Homo Sapiens (1985), absurdist play
 There is an Isle (1998), first volume of autobiography
 Consplawkus (1999), second volume
 A Writer's Life, third volume
 The Heart Has Its Reasons, anthology of short stories
 Beautiful Limerick
 Lóchrann an Dóchais, a biography of Nano Nagle

References

1927 births
20th-century Irish writers
21st-century Irish writers
Irish memoirists
Possibly living people
Writers from Limerick (city)